Yip Ka Yu (born 24 December 1996) is a former Hong Kong professional footballer.

Club career
On 15 July 2018, Yip was announced as a Yuen Long player.

On 2 July 2020, R&F head coach Yeung Ching Kwong announced that Yip had joined the club. On 14 October 2020, Yip left the club after his club's withdrawal from the HKPL in the new season.

References

External links
 
 HKFA
 

Living people
1996 births
Hong Kong footballers
Association football goalkeepers
Hong Kong First Division League players
Hong Kong Premier League players
Tai Po FC players
Hong Kong Rangers FC players
Lee Man FC players
Yuen Long FC players
R&F (Hong Kong) players